Frank Warner (March 27, 1926 – August 31, 2011) was an American  sound editor. He received the Special Achievement Academy Award during the 50th Academy Awards for the film Close Encounters of the Third Kind. This was for the Sound Editing of the film.

Selected filmography

Rocky IV (1986)
The King of Comedy (1982)
Rocky III (1982)
Raging Bull (1980)
Rocky II (1978)
Close Encounters of the Third Kind (1977)
Bound for Glory (1976)
Murder by Death (1976)
Taxi Driver (1976)
The Trial of Billy Jack (1974)
Jonathan Livingston Seagull (1973)
Paper Moon (1973)
Kotch (1971)
The Hawaiians (1970)
Little Big Man (1970)
They Call Me Mister Tibbs! (1970)
The Scalphunters (1968)

References

External links
 

American sound editors
Special Achievement Academy Award winners
Best Sound Editing Academy Award winners
1926 births
2011 deaths
People from Los Angeles